The Dornier Do 11 was a German heavy bomber, developed in secret in the early 1930s. It was originally called the Dornier F before being renamed by the Reichsluftfahrtministerium (RLM) in 1933, and was considered a heavy bomber at the time. It came into service in 1932, a continuation of a line of bomber designs from the Dornier Do P in 1930, and the Dornier Do Y in 1931. The line would continue to develop with the Dornier Do 13 and Dornier Do 23.

Design and development
One of the main features the Do 11 tested was a retractable undercarriage, but, due to problems with the gear, it was often left locked down. The aircraft entered service under the guise of a freight transport, and was used with the German railway in conjunction with Deutsche Luft Hansa, so that it could be shown publicly. What it was actually used for was as a trainer for the still secret Luftwaffe. 

The aircraft had a number of problems, which resulted in some crashes, and was generally unpopular with pilots. Especially problematic were wing vibrations which resulted in various precautions and modifications. Attempts were made to correct its faults, resulting in the so-called Do 11D, the last model with the Do 11 name. The Do 13 was a "simplified" Do 11 and came next, but had so many problems of its own that it did not fully enter service, with several of the first planes off the assembly line crashing. The later Do 23 corrected many faults of the design, but was still a lackluster aircraft, and was withdrawn from service by 1936, and replaced by superior aircraft that had since been developed. 

The Do 11 is noteworthy as having served in secret and having been the main heavy bomber of the quietly developing Luftwaffe, if only for a short while. It was also the first to have two large engines as opposed to its predecessors the Y and P, which used three and four engines respectively.

Variants
Data from:'''
Do F
Prototype of the Do 11 before redesignation by the RLM.
Do 11C
First production version powered by two Siemens-Halske Sh.22B-2 radial engines.
Do 11D
Second production version with a shorter-span wing, primarily introduced to alleviate extreme vibration of the Do 11C wings.

Operators

Bulgarian Air Force

Luftwaffe

Specifications (Do 11D)

See also

Notes

References

 Green, William. Warplanes of the Third Reich''. New York:Doubleday, 1972. .

Do 011
1930s German bomber aircraft
Aircraft first flown in 1932
Twin piston-engined tractor aircraft